Angiartarfik, former spelling Angîârtarfik, is a mountain in the Kujalleq municipality, southern Greenland.

Geography
Angiartarfik is a mountain with multiple rocky peaks, the highest of which reaches 1,824 m. This largely unglaciated mountain rises above Stordalen Havn, about 2 km west of the shore of Torsukattak Fjord. 

In the same manner as neighbouring Alleruusakasiit, located across the valley to the south, Angiartarfik is a renowned mountain among alpinists, especially its east face.

See also
 Big wall climbing
 List of mountains in Greenland

References

External links
Geographic features & Photographs around Angîârtarfik, in Vestgrønland, Greenland
Mountains of Greenland
Kujalleq

ceb:Angîârtarfik
sv:Angîârtarfik